The Battle of the Utus was fought in 447 between the army of the Eastern Roman (Byzantine) Empire, and the Huns led by Attila at Utus, a river that is today the Vit in Bulgaria. It was the last of the bloody pitched battles between the Eastern Roman Empire and the Huns, as the former attempted to stave off the Hunnic invasion.

The details about Attila's campaign which culminated in the battle of Utus, as well as the events afterwards, are obscure. Only a few short passages from Byzantine sources (Jordanes' Romana, the chronicle of Marcellinus Comes, and the Paschal Chronicle) are available. As with the whole activity of Attila's Huns in the Balkans, the fragmentary evidence does not permit an undisputed reconstruction of the events.

Background
Beginning in 443, when the Eastern Empire stopped its tribute to the Huns, Attila's army had invaded and ravaged the Balkan regions of the Eastern Empire. Attila's army invaded the Balkan provinces again in 447.

Battle
A strong Roman force under Arnegisclus, comes et magister utriusque militiae, "master and commander of both forces" (both foot and horse) of Thrace, moved out of its base at Marcianople westwards and engaged the Hunnic army at Utus in the Roman province of Dacia Ripensis. Arnegisclus was one of the Roman commanders who had been defeated during Attila's campaign of 443.

The Roman army was most likely a combined force, including the field armies of Illyricum, Thrace, and the Praesental Army (the Emperor's personal army)  The Romans were, according to most modern historians, defeated but it seems that losses were severe for both sides. One author characterized the battle as indecisive. Arnegisclus' horse was killed and he fought on foot until he was cut down.

Aftermath
Marcianople fell immediately to the Huns, who destroyed it; the city then lay desolate until the Emperor Justinian restored it one hundred years later. Even worse, Constantinople, the capital of the eastern half of the Roman Empire, was especially vulnerable to attack by the Huns as its walls had been ruined during an earthquake in January 447, and its population had suffered from an ensuing plague. However, the Praetorian prefect of the East Constantinus managed to repair the walls in just two months by mobilizing the city's manpower, with the help of the Circus factions. These hasty repairs, combined with the urgent transfer of a body of Isaurian soldiers into the city, plus the heavy losses incurred by the Huns' army in the Battle of Utus, forced Attila to abandon any thought of besieging the capital.

Instead, Attila marched south and laid waste the now-defenseless Balkan provinces (including Illyricum, Thrace, Moesia, Scythia, and both provinces of Roman Dacia) until he was turned back at Thermopylae. Callinicus of Rufinianae wrote in his Life of Saint Hypatius, who was still living in Thrace at the time, that "more than a hundred cities were captured, Constantinople almost came into danger and most men fled from it", although this was probably exaggerated. Peace was only restored when a treaty was signed a year later in 448. By this treaty, the Eastern Emperor Theodosius II agreed to pay Attila a tribute of 6,000 lbs of gold up front and 2,100 lbs annually. Additionally, a no man's land in the Roman territory was created; this extended 300 miles from Singidunum to Novae, with a depth of 100 miles or five days' journey south of the Danube and functioned as a buffer zone.

References

Sources 

Martindale, J. R. (ed.). The Prosopography of the Later Roman Empire, Cambridge University Press, 1980, vol.2, 
 Thompson, E. A.; Heather, Peter. The Huns, Blackwell, 1999. 

440s conflicts
Battles involving the Byzantine Empire
5th century in the Byzantine Empire
Battles involving the Huns
Military history of Bulgaria
447
440s in the Byzantine Empire
Attila the Hun